Thanat Jantaya (born March 26, 1989), is a Thai professional footballer who plays as an attacking midfielder for Thai League 1 club Chainat Hornbill.

References

1989 births
Living people
Thanat Jantaya
Thanat Jantaya
Association football midfielders
Thanat Jantaya
Thanat Jantaya
Thanat Jantaya